The 2019–20 New York Knicks season was the 74th season of the franchise in the National Basketball Association (NBA). Following a league-worst 17–65 record in the previous season, the Knicks had a 14 percent chance of receiving the first overall pick in the 2019 NBA draft. During the NBA draft lottery held on May 14, 2019, the Knicks received the third overall pick.

On December 6, 2019, head coach David Fizdale was fired by the Knicks after a 4–18 start, and Mike Miller was named the Knicks' interim head coach. On February 4, 2020, general manager Scott Perry took over basketball operations duties on an interim basis after the Knicks fired president Steve Mills. On March 2, Leon Rose was named as permanent replacement for Mills.

The season was suspended by the league officials following the games of March 11 after it was reported that Rudy Gobert tested positive for COVID-19. On June 4, the regular season was declared over with the remaining games being cancelled when the NBA Board of Governors approved a plan that would restart the season with 22 teams returning to play in the NBA Bubble on July 31, which was approved by the National Basketball Players Association the next day.

Draft

The Knicks entered the draft holding one first round pick and one second round pick. Prior to the NBA draft lottery, the Knicks had a 14 percent chance of receiving the first overall pick. They used the third overall pick to draft RJ Barrett, and selected Kyle Guy with the 55th overall pick, who was then traded to the Sacramento Kings in exchange for Ignas Brazdeikis.

Roster

Standings

Division

Conference

Game log

Preseason
The preseason schedule was announced on July 18, 2019.

|- style="background:#bfb;"
| 1
| October 7
| @ Washington
| 
| Barrett, Morris (17)
| Gibson (9)
| Randle (7)
| Capital One Arena9,420
| 1–0
|- style="background:#fbb;"
| 2
| October 11
| Washington
| 
| Morris (21)
| Portis (9)
| Ellington (5)
| Madison Square Garden19,812
| 1–1
|- style="background:#fbb;"
| 3
| October 16
| Atlanta
| 
| Randle (20)
| Morris, Randle (8)
| Barrett (6)
| Madison Square Garden19,812
| 1–2
|- style="background:#fbb;"
| 4
| October 18
| New Orleans
| 
| Randle (20)
| Randle, Smith Jr. (9)
| Smith Jr. (6)
| Madison Square Garden19,812
| 1–3

Regular season
The regular season schedule was released on August 12, 2019.

|- style="background:#fbb;"
| 1
| October 23
| @ San Antonio
| 
| Morris (26)
| Randle (11)
| Payton (8)
| AT&T Center18,354
| 0–1
|- style="background:#fbb;"
| 2
| October 25
| @ Brooklyn
| 
| Trier (22)
| Randle (11)
| Randle (4)
| Barclays Center17,732
| 0–2
|- style="background:#fbb;"
| 3
| October 26
| Boston
| 
| Barrett (26)
| Portis (11)
| Payton (5)
| Madison Square Garden19,812
| 0–3
|- style="background:#bfb;"
| 4
| October 28
| Chicago
| 
| Portis (28)
| Barrett (15)
| Barrett, Randle (5)
| Madison Square Garden19,812
| 1–3
|- style="background:#fbb;"
| 5
| October 30
| @ Orlando
| 
| Randle (16)
| Portis, Randle (10)
| Randle (7)
| Amway Center17,456
| 1–4

|- style="background:#fbb;"
| 6
| November 1
| @ Boston
| 
| Morris (29)
| Randle (10)
| Barrett, Randle (5)
| TD Garden18,624
| 1–5
|- style="background:#fbb;"
| 7
| November 3
| Sacramento
| 
| Morris (28)
| Randle (7)
| Trier (4)
| Madison Square Garden19,812
| 1–6
|- style="background:#fbb;"
| 8
| November 6
| @ Detroit
| 
| Randle (20)
| Barrett (6)
| Barrett (8)
| Little Caesars Arena15,463
| 1–7
|- style="background:#bfb;"
| 9
| November 8
| @ Dallas
| 
| Morris (29)
| Portis (12)
| Barrett, Ntilikina, Randle (4)
| American Airlines Center20,257
| 2–7
|- style="background:#fbb;"
| 10
| November 10
| Cleveland
| 
| Randle (20)
| Randle (16)
| Ntilikina (6)
| Madison Square Garden19,812
| 2–8
|- style="background:#fbb;"
| 11
| November 12
| @ Chicago
| 
| Morris (22)
| Morris (9)
| Barrett (9)
| United Center18,668
| 2–9
|- style="background:#bfb;"
| 12
| November 14
| Dallas
| 
| Morris (20)
| Randle (10)
| Smith Jr. (8)
| Madison Square Garden19,812
| 3–9
|- style="background:#fbb;"
| 13
| November 16
| Charlotte
| 
| Barrett (22)
| Robinson (12)
| Ntilikina, Randle (6)
| Madison Square Garden19,401
| 3–10
|- style="background:#bfb;"
| 14
| November 18
| Cleveland
| 
| Randle (30)
| Gibson, Robinson (8)
| Ntilikina (6)
| Madison Square Garden17,097
| 4–10
|- style="background:#fbb;"
| 15
| November 20
| @ Philadelphia
| 
| Morris (22)
| Morris (13)
| Morris (6)
| Wells Fargo Center20,384
| 4–11
|- style="background:#fbb;"
| 16
| November 23
| San Antonio
| 
| Morris (20)
| Randle (8)
| Ntilikina (9)
| Madison Square Garden19,320
| 4–12
|- style="background:#fbb;"
| 17
| November 24
| Brooklyn
| 
| Morris (26)
| Gibson, Randle (8)
| Ntilikina, Smith Jr. (5)
| Madison Square Garden18,770
| 4–13
|- style="background:#fbb;"
| 18
| November 27
| @ Toronto
| 
| Randle (19)
| Randle, Robinson (8)
| Barrett, Ntilikina, Smith Jr. (4)
| Scotiabank Arena19,800
| 4–14
|- style="background:#fbb;"
| 19
| November 29
| Philadelphia
| 
| Randle (22)
| Randle (10)
| Ntilikina, Randle (4)
| Madison Square Garden18,109
| 4–15

|- style="background:#fbb;"
| 20
| December 1
| Boston
| 
| Randle (26)
| Barrett (7)
| Smith Jr. (7)
| Madison Square Garden18,005
| 4–16
|- style="background:#fbb;"
| 21
| December 2
| @ Milwaukee
| 
| Randle (19)
| Robinson (14)
| Smith Jr. (3)
| Fiserv Forum17,385
| 4–17
|- style="background:#fbb;"
| 22
| December 5
| Denver
| 
| Robinson (17)
| Robinson (7)
| Barrett (5)
| Madison Square Garden18,171
| 4–18
|- style="background:#fbb;"
| 23
| December 7
| Indiana
| 
| Morris (25)
| Randle (12)
| Payton (7)
| Madison Square Garden19,110
| 4–19
|- style="background:#fbb;"
| 24
| December 10
| @ Portland
| 
| Randle (15)
| Portis (10)
| Payton (4)
| Moda Center19,393
| 4–20
|- style="background:#bfb;"
| 25
| December 11
| @ Golden State
| 
| Morris (36)
| Randle (13)
| Payton, Randle (5)
| Chase Center18,064
| 5–20
|- style="background:#bfb;"
| 26
| December 13
| @ Sacramento
| 
| Randle (26)
| Randle, Robinson (9)
| Morris (5)
| Golden 1 Center17,583
| 6–20
|- style="background:#fbb;"
| 27
| December 15
| @ Denver
| 
| Morris (22)
| Randle (9)
| Payton (11)
| Pepsi Center18,867
| 6–21
|- style="background:#bfb;"
| 28
| December 17
| Atlanta
| 
| Barrett (27)
| Robinson (13)
| Payton (9)
| Madison Square Garden18,268
| 7–21
|- style="background:#fbb;"
| 29
| December 20
| @ Miami
| 
| Portis (30)
| Portis, Randle (8)
| Dotson, Smith Jr. (5)
| American Airlines Arena19,704
| 7–22
|- style="background:#fbb;"
| 30
| December 21
| Milwaukee
| 
| Randle (20)
| Portis (9)
| Payton (10)
| Madison Square Garden18,124
| 7–23
|- style="background:#fbb;"
| 31
| December 23
| Washington
| 
| Randle (35)
| Robinson (13)
| Payton (12)
| Madison Square Garden19,413
| 7–24
|- style="background:#bfb;"
| 32
| December 26
| @ Brooklyn
| 
| Randle (33)
| Robinson (10)
| Payton (4)
| Barclays Center17,732
| 8–24
|- style="background:#bfb;"
| 33
| December 28
| @ Washington
| 
| Randle (30)
| Randle (16)
| Payton (8)
| Capital One Arena19,033
| 9–24

|- style="background:#bfb;"
| 34
| January 1
| Portland
| 
| Randle, Robinson (22)
| Randle (13)
| Ntilikina (10)
| Madison Square Garden19,812
| 10–24
|- style="background:#fbb;"
| 35
| January 3
| @ Phoenix
| 
| Morris (25)
| Randle (13)
| Payton (6)
| Talking Stick Resort Arena18,055
| 10–25
|- style="background:#fbb;"
| 36
| January 5
| @ L. A. Clippers
| 
| Morris (38)
| Randle (8)
| Allen (6)
| Staples Center19,068
| 10–26
|- style="background:#fbb;"
| 37
| January 7
| @ L. A. Lakers
| 
| Barrett (19)
| Randle (10)
| Payton (4)
| Staples Center18,997
| 10–27
|- style="background:#fbb;"
| 38
| January 8
| @ Utah
| 
| Ntilikina (16)
| Portis (13)
| Portis (6)
| Vivint Smart Home Arena18,306
| 10–28
|- style="background:#fbb;"
| 39
| January 10
| New Orleans
| 
| Gibson (19)
| Barrett (9)
| Payton (7)
| Madison Square Garden18,003
| 10–29
|- style="background:#bfb;"
| 40
| January 12
| Miami
| 
| Randle (26)
| Gibson, Randle (8)
| Payton (5)
| Madison Square Garden18,861
| 11–29
|- style="background:#fbb;"
| 41
| January 14
| @ Milwaukee
| 
| Randle (25)
| Randle (15)
| Allen (6)
| Fiserv Forum17,590
| 11–30
|- style="background:#fbb;"
| 42
| January 16
| Phoenix
| 
| Randle (26)
| Portis (10)
| Payton (7)
| Madison Square Garden18,215
| 11–31
|- style="background:#fbb;"
| 43
| January 18
| Philadelphia
| 
| Morris (20)
| Randle (12)
| Payton (7)
| Madison Square Garden17,812
| 11–32
|- style="background:#bfb;"
| 44
| January 20
| @ Cleveland
| 
| Morris, Randle (19)
| Randle (9)
| Payton (8)
| Rocket Mortgage FieldHouse17,133
| 12–32
|- style="background:#fbb;"
| 45
| January 22
| L. A. Lakers
| 
| Morris (20)
| Robinson (12)
| Payton (9)
| Madison Square Garden19,812
| 12–33
|- style="background:#fbb;"
| 46
| January 24
| Toronto
| 
| Dotson, Morris (21)
| Randle (11)
| Payton (11)
| Madison Square Garden18,883
| 12–34
|- style="background:#bfb;"
| 47
| January 26
| Brooklyn
| 
| Randle (22)
| Randle (15)
| Payton (9)
| Madison Square Garden17,831
| 13–34
|- style="background:#fbb;"
| 48
| January 28
| @ Charlotte
| 
| Randle (24)
| Robinson (10)
| Payton (8)
| Spectrum Center14,342
| 13–35
|- style="background:#fbb;"
| 49
| January 29
| Memphis
| 
| Morris (17)
| Randle (14)
| Payton (11)
| Madison Square Garden18,768
| 13–36

|- style="background:#bfb;"
| 50
| February 1
| @ Indiana
| 
| Morris (28)
| Randle (18)
| Smith Jr. (6)
| Bankers Life Fieldhouse17,923
| 14–36
|- style="background:#bfb;"
| 51
| February 3
| @ Cleveland
| 
| Morris (26)
| Payton (11)
| Payton (15)
| Rocket Mortgage FieldHouse16,303
| 15–36
|- style="background:#bfb;"
| 52
| February 6
| Orlando
| 
| Randle (22)
| Randle (8)
| Payton (9)
| Madison Square Garden18,895
| 16–36
|- style="background:#bfb;"
| 53
| February 8
| @ Detroit
| 
| Ellington, Randle (17)
| Payton (9)
| Payton (6)
| Little Caesars Arena15,980
| 17–36
|- style="background:#fbb;"
| 54
| February 9
| @ Atlanta
| 
| Randle (35)
| Randle (18)
| Payton (9)
| State Farm Arena16,309
| 17–37
|- style="background:#fbb;"
| 55
| February 12
| Washington
| 
| Randle (21)
| Randle (13)
| Payton (8)
| Madison Square Garden18,835
| 17–38
|- style="background:#fbb;"
| 56
| February 21
| Indiana
| 
| Portis (19)
| Robinson (8)
| Smith Jr. (6)
| Madison Square Garden19,812
| 17–39
|- style="background:#fbb;"
| 57
| February 24
| @ Houston
| 
| Barrett (21)
| Randle (12)
| Smith Jr. (5)
| Toyota Center18,055
| 17–40
|- style="background:#fbb;"
| 58
| February 26
| @ Charlotte
| 
| Randle (18)
| Robinson (16)
| Payton (9)
| Spectrum Center13,152
| 17–41
|- style="background:#fbb;"
| 59
| February 27
| @ Philadelphia
| 
| Randle (30)
| Randle (10)
| Payton (12)
| Wells Fargo Center20,175
| 17–42
|- style="background:#bfb;"
| 60
| February 29
| Chicago
| 
| Robinson (23)
| Randle, Robinson (10)
| Payton (10)
| Madison Square Garden19,812
| 18–42

|- style="background:#bfb;"
| 61
| March 2
| Houston
| 
| Barrett (27)
| Randle (16)
| Payton (6)
| Madison Square Garden18,142
| 19–42
|- style="background:#fbb;"
| 62
| March 4
| Utah
| 
| Randle (32)
| Randle (11)
| Payton (9)
| Madison Square Garden16,588
| 19–43
|- style="background:#fbb;"
| 63
| March 6
| Oklahoma City
| 
| Payton (18)
| Payton (9)
| Payton (8)
| Madison Square Garden19,499
| 19–44
|- style="background:#bfb;"
| 64
| March 8
| Detroit
| 
| Randle (22)
| Randle (12)
| Payton (6)
| Madison Square Garden18,361
| 20–44
|- style="background:#fbb;"
| 65
| March 10
| @ Washington
| 
| Ntilikina, Portis (20)
| Barrett, Portis (6)
| Ntilikina (10)
| Capital One Arena15,048
| 20–45
|- style="background:#bfb;"
| 66
| March 11
| @ Atlanta
| 
| Randle (33)
| Randle (11)
| Payton (12)
| State Farm Arena15,393
| 21–45

|- style="background:#;"
| 67
| March 13
| @ Miami
| 
| 
| 
| 
| American Airlines Arena
| 
|- style="background:#;"
| 68
| March 17
| Charlotte
| 
| 
| 
| 
| Madison Square Garden
| 
|- style="background:#;"
| 69
| March 18
| @ Boston
| 
| 
| 
| 
| TD Garden
| 
|- style="background:#;"
| 70
| March 21
| Golden State
| 
| 
| 
| 
| Madison Square Garden
| 
|- style="background:#;"
| 71
| March 23
| L.A. Clippers
| 
| 
| 
| 
| Madison Square Garden
| 
|- style="background:#;"
| 72
| March 25
| Toronto
| 
| 
| 
| 
| Madison Square Garden
| 
|- style="background:#;"
| 73
| March 27
| @ New Orleans
| 
| 
| 
| 
| Smoothie King Center
| 
|- style="background:#;"
| 74
| March 28
| @ Chicago
| 
| 
| 
| 
| United Center
| 
|- style="background:#;"
| 75
| April 1
| @ Memphis
| 
| 
| 
| 
| FedExForum
| 
|- style="background:#;"
| 76
| April 3
| Minnesota
| 
| 
| 
| 
| Madison Square Garden
| 
|- style="background:#;"
| 77
| April 5
| Miami
| 
| 
| 
| 
| Madison Square Garden
| 
|- style="background:#;"
| 78
| April 8
| Orlando
| 
| 
| 
| 
| Madison Square Garden
| 
|- style="background:#;"
| 79
| April 10
| @ Oklahoma City
| 
| 
| 
| 
| Chesapeake Energy Arena
| 
|- style="background:#;"
| 80
| April 12
| @ Toronto
| 
| 
| 
| 
| Scotiabank Arena
| 
|- style="background:#;"
| 81
| April 14
| Detroit
| 
| 
| 
| 
| Madison Square Garden
| 
|- style="background:#;"
| 82
| April 15
| @ Minnesota
| 
| 
| 
| 
| Target Center
|

Player statistics

Regular season statistics
As of March 12, 2020

|-
| style="text-align:left;"| || 10 || 0 || 11.7 || .432 || .313 || .636 || .9 || 2.1 || .5 || .2 || 5.0
|-
| style="text-align:left;"| || 56 || 55 || 30.4 || .402 || .320 || .614 || 5.0 || 2.6 || 1.0 || .3 || 14.3
|-
| style="text-align:left;"| || 9 || 0 || 5.9 || .273 || .111 || .800 || .6 || .4 || .0 || .1 || 1.9
|-
| style="text-align:left;"| || 29 || 19 || 23.6 || .402 || .333 || .810 || 2.3 || 1.4 || .9 || .1 || 8.1
|-
| style="text-align:left;"| || 48 || 0 || 17.4 || .414 || .362 || .667 || 1.9 || 1.2 || .5 || .1 || 6.7
|-
| style="text-align:left;"| || 36 || 1 || 15.5 || .351 || .350 || .846 || 1.8 || 1.2 || .4 || .1 || 5.1
|-
| style="text-align:left;"| || 62 || 56 || 16.5 || .584 || .286 || .732 || 4.3 || .8 || .4 || .5 || 6.1
|-
| style="text-align:left;"| || 12 || 10 || 23.8 || .455 || .280 || .625 || 3.3 || 1.7 || .8 || .3 || 6.8
|-
| style="text-align:left;"| || 65 || 4 || 17.9 || .359 || .327 || .653 || 2.8 || .9 || .4 || .4 || 6.4
|-
| style="text-align:left;"| || 43 || 43 || 32.3 || .442 || .439 || .823 || 5.4 || 1.4 || .8 || .4 || 19.6
|-
| style="text-align:left;"| || 57 || 26 || 20.8 || .393 || .321 || .864 || 2.1 || 3.0 || .9 || .3 || 6.3
|-
| style="text-align:left;"| || 45 || 36 || 27.7 || .439 || .203 || .570 || 4.7 || 7.2 || 1.6 || .4 || 10.0
|-
| style="text-align:left;"| || 66 || 5 || 21.1 || .450 || .358 || .763 || 5.1 || 1.5 || .5 || .3 || 10.1
|-
| style="text-align:left;"| || 64 || 64 || 32.5 || .460 || .277 || .733 || 9.7 || 3.1 || .8 || .3 || 19.5
|-
| style="text-align:left;"| || 61 || 7 || 23.1 || .742 ||  || .568 || 7.0 || .6 || .9 || 2.0 || 9.7
|-
| style="text-align:left;"| || 34 || 3 || 15.8 || .341 || .296 || .509 || 2.3 || 2.9 || .8 || .2 || 5.5
|-
| style="text-align:left;"| || 24 || 1 || 12.1 || .481 || .358 || .791 || 1.2 || 1.2 || .1 || .2 || 6.5

Transactions

Trades

Additions

Subtractions

References

External links
 2019–20 New York Knicks at Basketball-Reference.com

New York Knicks seasons
New York Knicks
New York Knicks
New York Knicks
2010s in Manhattan
2020s in Manhattan
Madison Square Garden